Norman Ginzberg is a French writer. His father was an American soldier who disembarked on D-Day at Omaha Beach. He made his career in journalism, before turning to communications consultancy. He lives in le Gers.

His books include Les captives de la Vallee de Zion, Omaha and Arizona Tom.

References

 

French writers
Living people
Year of birth missing (living people)